Hanan Younis (born 16 August 1971), widely known by her stage name Waed (meaning "promise" in Arabic), is a Saudi singer and entertainer in the Middle East.

Biography
Waed was born and raised in Saudi Arabia. Her father is Baker Younis, who is one of the founders of the broadcasting station and television in Saudi Arabia and her mother is of Iraqi descent. At an early age, Waed enjoyed listening to a variety of music and her only dream was to become a singer. Waed's first appearance on television was when she sang at the age of 7 in a children's program. She took part in numerous shows/clubs in high school as well as in various charitable organization's concerts.
Waed's voice is distinguished with an ability to express a character and a performance of her own. This allowed her to perform many songs written by Saudi composers such as Mohamed Abdu and Talal Maddah. Waed has made many performances and interviews on various television and radio stations all over the Arab world.

Personal life
Waed was married to a Lebanese shortly in the early 2000s, with whom she had one daughter.

Discography

Studio albums
 2001: Jonoun
 2004: Wejhat Nazar
 2008: Ya Ahlahoum
 2018: Ya Kaoeni

References 

21st-century Saudi Arabian women singers
Saudi Arabian film actresses
Saudi Arabian television actresses
Saudi Arabian people of Iraqi descent
1971 births
Living people
Rotana Records artists